The Men's team sprint LC1-4/CP 3/4 track cycling event at the 2004 Summer Paralympics was competed on 19 September. It was won by the team representing .

Qualifying

Only for positioning in the heats - no eliminations

1st round

Heat 1

Heat 2

Heat 3

Heat 4

Final round

Gold

Bronze

Team Lists

References

M